Ásta Júlía Grímsdóttir (born 22 February 2001) is an Icelandic basketball player for Valur of the Úrvalsdeild kvenna. She won the Icelandic championship in 2019 and 2021 and the Icelandic Cup in 2019 as a member of Valur.

Playing career

KR
Ásta came up through the junior programs of KR and played two season for the club in the second-tier 1. deild kvenna. In 2017 she was named the 1. deild kvenna Young Player of the Year after averaging 9.9 points, 8.6 rebounds and 2.1 blocks per game.

Valur
After the 2016–2017 season, Ásta signed with Valur of the top-tier Úrvalsdeild kvenna. She helped the team to the Úrvalsdeild finals in 2018 where it lost to Haukar, 3–2.

She had a breakout season in 2018–2019, averaging 8.8 points and 7.3 rebounds, and helping Valur to the best record in the league. On 16 February 2019, she won the Icelandic Cup after Valur defeated Stjarnan in the Cup finals, 74–90. On 27 April, Ásta helped Valur win the national championship for the first time in the team's history.

Houston Baptist Huskies
In March 2019, Ásta agreed to join the Houston Baptist Huskies women's basketball team.

Return to Iceland
On 23 September 2020, Ásta signed a 2-year contract with Valur. On 2 June 2021, she won the national championship after Valur beat Haukar 3–0 in the Úrvalsdeild finals.

National team career
Ásta played 17 games for the Icelandic national U-16 team from 2016 to 2017. In June 2016, she was named to the All-First team during the Nordic Championships. In 2017, she averaged 11.3 points and 14.6 rebounds for Iceland during the U16 Women's European Championship Division B. In 2018, she appeared in 13 games for the Icelandic national U-18 team.

Personal life
Ásta is the daughter of Icelandic parliament member Helga Vala Helgadóttir and Grímur Atlason, a politician and former manager of the Iceland Airwaves music festival.

References

External links
Icelandic statistics at Icelandic Basketball Association
Houston Baptist profile

2001 births
Living people
Houston Christian Huskies women's basketball players
Asta Julia Grimsdottir
Asta Julia Grimsdottir
Asta Julia Grimsdottir
Asta Julia Grimsdottir
Asta Julia Grimsdottir
Forwards (basketball)